This is a list of local anesthetic agents. Not all of these drugs are still used in clinical practice and in research. Some are primarily of historical interest.

See also

 4-Aminobenzoic acid
 Amino amide
 Amino esters
 Anesthesia
 Anesthetic
 Brachial plexus block
 Cocaine analogues: local anesthetics
 Dental anesthesia
 Dibucaine number
 Epidural
 Intravenous regional anesthesia
 Local anesthesia
 Local anesthetic with vasoconstrictor
 Local anesthetic toxicity
 Methemoglobin
 Sodium channel blocker
 Spinal anesthesia
 Topical anesthesia
 Veterinary anesthesia

References

Local anesthetics